JCK may refer to:

 Java Compatibility Kit
 Julia Creek Airport (IATA airport code JCK), Julia Creek, Queensland, Australia

See also

 CJCK-FM, call sign JCK in region C
 KJCK (disambiguation), call sign JCK in region K
 WJCK (disambiguation), call sign JCK in region W